Nívea Maria Cândido Graieb (born 7 March 1947) is a Brazilian actress.

Career 

While working as a model, she was discovered by director Walter Avancini at age 17. Avancini helped Nívea land her first role in the soap opera in A Outra Face de Anita, aired by TV Excelsior of São Paulo in 1964.

In more than forty years was uninterrupted presence on television. Participated in numerous successful soap operas, with important characters, such as Gabriela, A Moreninha (1975), Dona Xepa (1977), Maria, Maria (1978), Coração Alado (1980), the miniseries Anos Dourados (1986), Brega & Chique (1987), Meu Bem, Meu Mal (1990), Pedra sobre Pedra (1992), O Clone (2001), the miniseries A Casa das Sete Mulheres, Celebridade (2003), O Profeta (2006) and Caminho das Índias (2009). Recently, he made a very special involvement in the novel by Gilberto Braga, Insensato Coração (2011).

In 2006, Nivea Maria participated in the reality show, Dança dos Famosos, the program Domingão do Faustão, and Rede Globo.

He was cast in the soap opera Aquele Beijo. He is currently playing in the novel Salve Jorge Isaurinha, the family matriarch Alcântara Vieira.

Personal life 

She is the sister of actress Glauce Graieb. She was married to actor Edson França, with whom he had two children: Viviane and Edson, and divorced director of the nucleus of the Rede Globo soap operas, Herval Rossano (1976–2003) with whom she had daughter Vanessa (1980).

Filmography

References

External links 

1947 births
Living people
Actresses from São Paulo
Brazilian television actresses
Brazilian telenovela actresses
Brazilian stage actresses